The German Socio-Cultural Organisation in Wrocław (in German Deutsche Sozial-Kulturelle Gesellschaft in Breslau, DSKG Breslau for short) is an organisation of the German minority in the Lower Silesian Voivodeship. It has its seat in Wrocław and is a member of the Association of the German Socio-Cultural Organisations in Poland.

Links
 Website

German diaspora in Poland
Silesian culture
Lower Silesian Voivodeship
Organisations based in Wrocław